Élisabeth Pochon (born 19 April 1955) is a French politician who served as Member of Parliament for Seine-Saint-Denis's 8th constituency between and 2012 and 2017.

She lost her seat in the 2017 election.

References 

1955 births
Living people

Deputies of the 14th National Assembly of the French Fifth Republic
People from Constantine, Algeria
Socialist Party (France) politicians
Women members of the National Assembly (France)
21st-century French women politicians
21st-century French politicians
Algerian emigrants to France